Tarek El Sayed  (born 9 October 1978) is a retired Egyptian football player who played for El Zamalek for most of his football career. He also played for Itesalat, and he played for Tersana in the Egyptian Second Division and retired after one season.

El Sayed made several appearances for the Egypt national football team, including nine qualifying matches for various FIFA World Cups.

Career

Zamalek
El Sayed played with El Zamalek for 13 seasons during which he dominated the left wing position. At the end of 2007-2008 season and after winning the Egyptian cup, El Zamalek did not include either Tarek or his teammate Besheer El-Tabei in the new season's team roster, and so both were free agents.

Itesalat
Shocked to be abandoned by his former team, he moved to Itesalat. He stayed at Itesalat for only half a season and scored 2 goals.

Tersana
In January 2009, El Sayed agreed to move to Tersana to help the team avoid relegation to the second division. El Sayed scored 2 goals for Tersana by the end of that season, but the club was eventually relegated. El Sayed announced that he would transfer to another team; however, when his transfer to either El Geish or El-Entag El-Harby did not materialize, he decided to retire.

In 2009, Tersana manager Yehia El Sayed convinced Tarek El Sayed to return to football and to lead Tersana in the Egyptian Second Division.

International goals
Scores and results list Egypt's goal tally first.

Titles as a player 

Zamalek SC
 Egyptian Premier League: 2000–01, 2002–03, 2003–04
 Egypt Cup: 1999-00, 2001–02, 2007–08
 Egyptian Super Cup: 2001, 2002
 African Cup Winners' Cup: 2000
 CAF Champions League: 2002
 CAF Super Cup: 2003
 Afro-Asian Club Championship: 1997
 Arab Champions League: 2003
 Saudi-Egyptian Super Cup: 2003

Egyptian national team
 African Cup of Nations: 2006, 2008

References

External links
 
 Tarek El-Sayed Profile At Footballdatabase.eu

1978 births
Living people
Egyptian footballers
Egypt international footballers
2002 African Cup of Nations players
2004 African Cup of Nations players
2006 Africa Cup of Nations players
2008 Africa Cup of Nations players
Zamalek SC players
Tersana SC players
Egyptian Premier League players
Association football wingers
Footballers from Cairo